Chrysolarentia is a genus of moths in the family Geometridae erected by Arthur Gardiner Butler in 1882. It is mainly found in Australia with one species (Chrysolarentia subrectaria) found also in New Zealand.

Selected species

References

Euphyia